Gennaro Antonio Federico (died Naples, 1744) was a Neapolitan poet and opera librettist. He is best remembered for his collaborations with G. B. Pergolesi including La serva padrona.

Libretti 
La Zita (opera buffa; set by Costantino Roberto 1731)
Lo frate 'nnamorato (commedia musicale; set by Giovanni Battista Pergolesi 1732)
L'Ippolita (opera buffa; set by Nicola Conti 1733)
L'Ottavio (commedia per musica; set by Gaetano Latilla 1733 , set by Pietro Alessandro Guglielmi 1760)
La serva padrona (intermezzo;  set by Giovanni Battista Pergolesi 1733,  set by Girolamo Abos 1744,  set by Pietro Alessandro Guglielmi 1780, Giovanni Paisiello 1781 )
Gl'Ingannati (commedia per musica;  set by Gaetano Latilla, 1734)
La marina de Chiaja (chelleta, revision of an earlier libretto;  set by Pietro Pulli, 1734) 
Il Flaminio (commedia per musica;  set by Giovanni Battista Pergolesi 1735 )
Il Filippo (opera buffa;  set by Costantino Roberto 1735 )
I due baroni (opera buffa;  set by Giuseppe Sellitto 1736 )
La Rosaura (opera buffa;  set by Domenico Sarro, 1736)
La Teodora (opera sacra;  set by Papebrochio Fungoni, 1737)
Gismondo (commedia per musica;  set by Gaetano Latilla, 1737)
Da un disordine nasce un ordine (opera buffa;  set by Vincenzo Legrenzio Ciampi, 1737)
Il conte (dramma giocoso per musica;  set by Leonardo Leo 1738 )
Inganno per inganno (opera buffa;  set by Nicola Bonifacio Logroscino, 1738)
La locandiera (scherzo comico per musica;  set by Pietro Auletta, 1738)
Ortensio (commedia per musica;  set by Giovan Gualberto Brunetti, 1739)
Amor vuol sofferenza (commedia per musica;  set by Leonardo Leo 1739, and by Nicola Bonifacio Logroscino come La finta frascatana, 1751)
La Beatrice (opera buffa;  set by Vincenzo Legrenzio Ciampi, 1740)
L'Alidoro (commedia per musica;  set by Leonardo Leo, 1740;  set by Matteo Capranica come L'Aurelio, 1748)
L'Alessandro (commedia per musica;  set by Leonardo Leo, 1741)
La Lionara (opera buffa;  set by Vincenzo Legrenzio Ciampi 1742, and Nicola Bonifacio Logroscino 1743 )
Il fantastico od Il nuovo Chisciotte (commedia per musica after Miguel de Cervantes;  set by Leonardo Leo, 1743)
Il copista burlato (commedia;  set by Antonio Sacchini, 1759)

References

1744 deaths